Dark York is the first mixtape by American rapper and producer Le1f. It was released on Greedhead Music and Camp & Street on April 9, 2012.

Critical reception

Alex Macpherson of Fact called the mixtape "a murky, often demanding and mostly enthralling listen full of lyrical and sonic twists that wears its radical nature lightly." He added, "Ultimately, Dark York feels like a gauntlet thrown down to the straight hip-hop world, not an inward-looking one-off." Hard Ashurst of Pitchfork praised the mixtape's music and stated that "Le1f matches the forward-thinking production punch for punch, coming across as a compelling and provocative rapper at every turn." Duncan Cooper of The Fader described the mixtape as "one of the most provocative rap releases so far this year, a major work that constantly and subversively carves a distinct space for itself without stepping outside of the feel of popular hip-hop."

Accolades

Track listing

References

External links
 

2012 mixtape albums
Debut mixtape albums
Leif (rapper) albums
Greedhead Music albums